The ALLY Foundation is an American 501(c)(3), not-for-profit organization based in Boston, Massachusetts, concerned with sexual violence. 

The ALLY Foundation was founded in December 2002 by Andrea Casanova and Steven Stiles in memory of their murdered daughter and step daughter, Alexandra Zapp ("Ally").  Ally was murdered on July 18, 2002, by convicted sex offender Paul Leahy in a Burger King restroom on her drive home to Newport, Rhode Island.

References

External links 

 Official website

Non-profit organizations based in Boston
Advocacy groups in the United States
Sexual abuse victims advocacy